Danzhutou (丹竹头; Hakka: Tan Tsuk Theu) is a village in Buji, Longgang District, Shenzhen, Guangdong Province, China.

Demographics
The original village population consisted of approximately 500 people of the Hakka dialect group. The variant of Hakka spoken is called Sin On. The inhabitants use 4 surnames: Shen (沈; Hakka: Shim), 80%), Ling (凌), Luo (罗) and Zhang (张).

Later village filled with low rise buildings and a large immigrant population.

Economy 
The village has prospered, due to its proximity to Shenzhen, just outside the Shenzhen Economic Zone. It is surrounded by factory complexes. The original villagers became wealthy landlords. Even the poorest villager has shelter. The immigrant population runs most of the businesses, and rents housing.

See also
 Danzhutou Station, Longgang Line, Shenzhen Metro
 沈
 凌
 罗
 张

References
丹竹头村史 / Danzhutou Village History Video (Part 1)
丹竹头村史 / Danzhutou Village History Video (Part 2)

External links 
 :zh:丹竹头 
丹竹頭站 / Danzhutou Station (Train) 
Writings inside the SHEN Shichang Ancestral Hall 
 
 
丹竹头
丹竹头
Jun Yue Express Hotel
Kindlion Hotel
Century Kingdom Hotel
Old map with Danzhutou at the top right hand corner

Geography of Shenzhen